Elbe-Saale was a Verwaltungsgemeinschaft ("collective municipality") in the district Salzlandkreis, in Saxony-Anhalt, Germany. It was situated on the left bank of the Elbe, around the confluence with the Saale. The seat of the Verwaltungsgemeinschaft was in Barby. It was disbanded on 1 January 2010.

The Verwaltungsgemeinschaft Elbe-Saale consisted of the following municipalities:

 Barby
 Breitenhagen 
 Glinde 
 Gnadau 
 Groß Rosenburg
 Lödderitz 
 Pömmelte 
 Sachsendorf 
 Tornitz 
 Wespen
 Zuchau

References

Former Verwaltungsgemeinschaften in Saxony-Anhalt